Zell Miles (October 6, 1909 - December 18, 1970) was a professional baseball left fielder and pitcher in the Negro leagues. He played with the Chicago American Giants from 1937 to 1940. He also played for the Seattle Steelheads in the West Coast Negro Baseball Association in 1946 and the Minot Mallards of the Mandak League in 1951.

References

External links
 and Seamheads

Chicago American Giants players
Minot Mallards players
Seattle Steelheads players
1909 births
1970 deaths
Baseball outfielders
Baseball pitchers
Baseball players from Alabama
20th-century African-American sportspeople